Arthur John Pink (15 November 1900 – 5 June 1986) was an Australian rules footballer who played with Geelong in the Victorian Football League (VFL).

Football
Pink, who was born in Beeac, went to Geelong High School  and was recruited from the Newtown Football Club.

A lightly built rover, Pink started his Geelong career in 1923 when he played 15 league games. This included Geelong's semi final loss to Fitzroy, during which he received a knock to the head that left him temporarily unconscious. He was given the award for Geelong's best junior player at the club awards that October.

Pink appeared in all 16 games Geelong played in the 1924 VFL season. Towards the end of the season he was a VFL representative at the Hobart Carnival and was named amongst the state's best players in a win over Western Australia, with four goals. He polled three votes in the 1924 Brownlow Medal, which were enough to finish equal fifth.

A knee injury sustained in the opening round of the 1925 season kept Pink out of the team until round 13, a win over Richmond. The following week, against St Kilda at Junction Oval, Pink again injured his knee. The club doctor gave Pink the unfortunate news that the knee cartilage was damaged so badly his football career was over.

War service
Pink volunteered for part time service in the Volunteer Defence Corps during World War II, serving for three years in the Geelong area.

References

External links

1900 births
Australian rules footballers from Victoria (Australia)
Geelong Football Club players
Newtown Football Club players
1986 deaths
Volunteer Defence Corps soldiers